Schildt is a surname. Notable people with the surname include:

Herbert Schildt (born 1951), American musician and computing author
Melchior Schildt (1592 or 1593 – 1667), German composer and organist
Wolmar Schildt
Wolmar Onni Schildt (1851–1913), Finnish politician
Wolmar Styrbjörn Schildt :fi:Wolmar Schildt, Finish doctor and translator, and linguist, developer of Finnish vocabulary
Peter Schildt (born 1951), Swedish actor
Runar Schildt (1888–1925), Swedish-speaking Finnish writer

See also
Mike Shildt (born 1968), American baseball manager
Schild